Nikita Kotlov (born September 20, 1991) is an American soccer player who plays for Maltese club Mosta FC.

Career

College
Kotlov spent his entire college career at Indiana University.  He made a total of 85 appearances for the Hoosiers, tallying 26 goals and 14 assists.  On December 9, 2012, he scored the game-winning goal in the College Cup final over Georgetown.

Professional
On January 21, 2014, Kotlov was selected in the fourth round (73rd overall) of the 2014 MLS SuperDraft by the Portland Timbers, but was cut prior to the start of the season.

On March 24, 2015, Kotlov signed a contract with United Soccer League club Saint Louis FC.  He made his professional debut on April 2 in a 2–0 victory over the Tulsa Roughnecks.

On August 24, 2019, Kotlov signed a contract with Mosta FC of the Maltese Premier League.

References

External links
Indiana Hoosiers

1991 births
Living people
American soccer players
American expatriate soccer players
Association football midfielders
Portland Timbers draft picks
Indiana Hoosiers men's soccer players
Saint Louis FC players
Mosta F.C. players
USL Championship players
Maltese Premier League players
Soccer players from Indianapolis
American expatriates in Malta
Expatriate footballers in Malta